Hurrah Pass (el. 4780 ft.) is a mountain pass in Utah.

References

Mountain passes of Utah
Landforms of San Juan County, Utah